XHSFP-FM is a Mexican radio station in San Felipe, Baja California, Mexico. It is known as PSN Radio.

References

Radio stations in Baja California
Spanish-language radio stations